Cochylimorpha coloratana is a species of moth of the family Tortricidae. It is found in Saisan in south-western Siberia.

References

Moths described in 1899
Cochylimorpha
Moths of Asia